James Terry Steib, S.V.D. (born May 17, 1940) is an American prelate of the Roman Catholic Church. Steib served as an auxiliary bishop of the Archdiocese of St. Louis in Missouri from 1983 to 1993. He became the first African-American bishop of the Diocese of Memphis in Tennessee in 1993, serving there until 2016.

Biography

Early life 
James Terry Steib was born on May 17, 1940, in Vacherie, Louisiana, one of five children of Rosemond and Vivian Steib.  As a child, Steib worked with his family harvesting sugar cane. After graduating from high school, Steib attended St. Augustine Seminary in Bay St. Louis, Mississippi, and St. Michael's Mission House Seminary in Conesus, New York.  He graduated with a bachelor degree from St. Mary's Mission Seminary in Techny, Illinois.

Priesthood 
On January 6, 1967, Steib was ordained as a priest by Archbishop Philip Matthew Hannan for the Society of the Divine Word in Bay St. Louis. After his ordination, he started working at Saint Stanislaus College in Bay St. Louis, teaching English, literature, religion, reading and speech to high school students. He also held a position as assistant dean of students at Saint Stanislaus from 1967 to 1969. In 1973, Steib graduated from Xavier University in New Orleans with a masters degree in guidance and counseling.

In 1976, Steib was appointed as provincial superior of his order's Southern Province, holding that position for three years. In 1979, he became vice president of the Conference of Major Superiors of Men.

Auxiliary Bishop of St. Louis 
On December 6, 1983, Pope John Paul II appointed Steib as an auxiliary bishop of the Archdiocese of St. Louis and titular bishop of Fallaba. He was consecrated on February 10, 1984, by Archbishop John L. May, with Bishop George Gottwald and Bishop Charles Koester serving as co-consecrators.

Bishop of Memphis 
On March 24, 1993, John Paul II appointed Steib as bishop of the Diocese of Memphis. He was installed on May 5, 1993. One of Steib's primary accomplishments was reopening eight Catholic schools in Memphis that had been closed for financial reasons by a previous bishop.  In an interview, Steib commented on this:When we closed a school in an urban area, we were leaving more than buildings behind; we were leaving behind children who yearned for a Catholic school more than ever.  It is the heritage of Catholic education to lift up those most in need. In 2004, a Memphis man named Steib and the Diocese of Memphis in a sexual abuse lawsuit.  The plaintiff claimed that Juan Carlos Duran, a Bolivian priest at Church of the Ascension in Raleigh, Tennessee, had sexually abused him in 1999 when his was 14 years old.  After a church investigation, Steib banned Duran from ministry and sent him to a center for treatment. Duran was eventually defrocked. In 2006. the Diocese settled the case for $2 million. When interviewed for a deposition in the case, Steib had these comments:I don’t know that the church did not respond appropriately.  I think it responded according to what it knew and believed at the time. I think that many of the times saw this as a very moral issue … and … you remove the person … from the temptation or the sin, you know.In June 2005, Steib expressed his views on outreach to gays and lesbians in his pastoral letter "This Far by Faith":To be sure that we do not leave anyone behind…to be sure that we promote genuine gratitude and reverence for the gift that each one of us is to the Church, we have begun to lay the foundations for a diocesan ministry with Catholic gay and lesbian persons.On September 9, 2005, a man sued Steib and the Diocese of Memphis in a case involving Paul St. Charles, a priest who led the Catholic Youth Organization in the diocese.  The plaintiff accused St. Charles of molesting him at a drive-in movie when he was an altar server in the 1970's.  Steib had ordered a diocese review of the allegations in 2004 and on November 30, 2004, suspended St. Charles from ministry. In 2009, Steib responded to protests by other American bishops over the University of Notre Dame inviting President Barack Obama to speak at its commencement ceremony, due to Obama's position on abortion rights for women.  Steib remarked:Nothing was done during other administrations, nothing was said when other presidents who favored the war in Iraq with its constant killing, or who favored capital punishment were given awards in the name of the Church, even though those presidents were not adhering to Catholic Right to Life principles.On December 21, 2015, the Memphis City Council renamed a portion of Central Avenue as J. Terry Steib Lane in honor of the bishop.

On August 23, 2016, Pope Francis accepted Steib's letter of resignation as bishop of Memphis.

See also
 
 Catholic Church hierarchy
 Catholic Church in the United States
 Historical list of the Catholic bishops of the United States
 List of Catholic bishops of the United States
 Lists of patriarchs, archbishops, and bishops

References

External links
 Roman Catholic Diocese of Memphis Official Site
 National Black Catholic Congress bio of J. Terry Steib
 National Black Catholic Clergy Caucus bio of J. Terry Steib

1940 births
Living people
20th-century Roman Catholic bishops in the United States
21st-century Roman Catholic bishops in the United States
African-American Roman Catholic bishops
Steib, Terry
Roman Catholic Archdiocese of St. Louis
Roman Catholic Diocese of Memphis
Xavier University of Louisiana alumni
Religious leaders from Louisiana
Roman Catholic bishops in Tennessee
Catholics from Louisiana
Divine Word Missionaries Order
21st-century African-American people
20th-century African-American people
African-American Catholic consecrated religious